Mark Labberton is the Clifford L. Penner Presidential Chair at Fuller Theological Seminary. Before he became Fuller's president, he served for 16 years as senior pastor of the First Presbyterian Church of Berkeley, California.

Early life and education
Having grown up in Yakima, Washington, Labberton states that he was raised in a home that disdained religion. Labberton embraced Christianity during his undergraduate years at Whitman College. After earning his bachelor's degree he went to Fuller for his Masters of Divinity. He earned a Ph.D. in theology from the University of Cambridge.  He was ordained in the Presbyterian Church (USA) and served in pastoral ministry for three decades.

Works

Books

As editor

References

Date of birth missing (living people)
Living people
Seminary presidents
Whitman College alumni
Alumni of the University of Cambridge
Fuller Theological Seminary faculty
Year of birth missing (living people)
Presbyterian Church (USA) teaching elders